The San Leandro Bay Bridge, better known as the Bay Farm Island Bridge, is a single-leaf bascule drawbridge spanning the San Leandro Channel, the inlet of San Leandro Bay within the San Francisco Bay Area, California, United States. It carries California State Route 61 and links the main island of Alameda with Bay Farm Island within the city of Alameda. The present bridge was completed in 1953; it is paralleled by a second bridge (completed in 1995) devoted to pedestrian and bicycle traffic, the Bay Farm Island Bicycle Bridge.

The Bay Farm Island Bridge is one of the four bridges and two tunnels linking Alameda Island with the mainland. It is the longest bridge of the four.

History 
A toll bridge at this location was first built in 1854, consisting of a wooden trestle surfaced with crushed oyster shells. The owners abandoned the bridge after a failed business deal for land on Bay Farm Island, and the 1854 bridge subsequently rotted. Alameda County constructed a second bridge in 1875. The second bridge had been repaired in 1890, and was replaced by a third bridge in 1898. Parts of the third bridge had initially been built in 1881 to span the Oakland Estuary at Webster Street, and were moved to span the San Leandro Channel in 1898; the third bridge was a swing-type bridge. By 1904, it was described as a "creaking old bridge", and by 1912, the bridge had "settled dangerously" and "needed immediate repairs."

In 1899, Mr. Gighilone, a vegetable farmer from Bay Farm Island, was ambushed by customs officers while crossing the bridge. The customs officers believed he was in league with opium smugglers who supposedly had their headquarters on Bay Farm Island; the smugglers purportedly used vegetable peddlers to smuggle opium across the bridge to Alameda, where it would be taken to San Francisco for distribution. When Gighilone was commanded to stop, he thought he was being robbed and attempted to escape until several bullets convinced him to stop.

The fourth bridge, completed in 1953 and opened for service on July 1 of that year, was constructed by the California Department of Transportation (CalTrans) as part of California State Route 61. It is owned and maintained by CalTrans, District 4.

In late 2015 and early 2016, the road and bicycle bridges were temporarily closed at night to accommodate maintenance activities, including repainting the road bridge. It had last been painted in 1978.

Design 
The 1953 road bridge is the longest bascule bridge in Alameda County by overall length. The existing leaf is opened by two  motors in approximately 135 seconds. The bridge was designed by the California Division of Highways, Bridge Department.

The main pier of the 1953 road bridge is the largest cofferdam built on a state highway since the construction of the San Francisco–Oakland Bay Bridge. Interlocks are provided so that traffic gates and bollards must be raised before the draw can be opened.

The 1995 bicycle bridge is linked to the 1953 road bridge so that when the road bridge opens, the bicycle bridge also opens; however, the bicycle bridge can be operated manually to open independently of the road bridge. The bicycle bridge is operated using two hydraulic pistons and two  motors; the other drawbridges linking Alameda to the mainland operate using gearboxes and gears. It is the only pedestrian bascule bridge in the United States.

References

External links
 
 . Video showing closing sequence of both bridges.

Bridges in Alameda County, California
Bascule bridges in the United States
Bridges completed in 1953
Road bridges in California
Alameda, California
Buildings and structures in Oakland, California
San Francisco Bay Trail
Steel bridges in the United States
Concrete bridges in California
Warren truss bridges in the United States